GNO may refer to:
 Gamma Normids
 Girls' Night Out (disambiguation)
 "G.N.O. (Girls Night Out)", a song by Miley Cyrus from the album Hannah Montana 2: Meet Miley Cyrus
 "G.N.O", a song by Wonder Girls from the album Wonder World 
 GNO/ME, a Unix-like operating system for the Apple IIGS
 Gnomic aspect
 Greater New Orleans
 Greek National Opera
 Northern Gondi language